Sani may refer to:

Sani (surname), a list of people
Sani Ahmed, Nigerian basketball coach
Sani, Mauritania
Sani Pass, pass in the Drakensberg linking Lesotho to South Africa
Shani, in Hindu astrology, Saturn
 Sani, a village in Zanskar, Jammu and Kashmir state, India
Sani Monastery next to Sani village in Zanskar
Sani, Burkina Faso
 The Sani ethnic minority, grouped by the Chinese government as part of the Yi people
 Sani, singer of pop band Aikakone in Finland
 Sani, a North American Wild Kratts Girl from the series Wild Kratts